Miyare is a settlement in Kenya's Nyanza Province.

References 

It is a Primary School.
Miyare is a place named after a man Jaduong Miyare.
A certain Known old Teacher Japuonj Ambrose Onyango Omollo and Hezron Ochieng' are some of the teachers who worked there. Fred Owino is another great teacher who hails from here, currently teaching in Tassia School Nairobi.  
Miyare has the following Clans:
The Great Jo'Kalkada
Jo'wakla 
Jo'karadolo 
Jo'kateg 
Jo'puny 
Jo'kondiek among others.
Victor George Otieno a grandchild to Japuonj Ambrose Onyango Omollo topped in K.C.P.E in 2002 Nyaharwa zone.

Populated places in Nyanza Province